Kazuhiko Masumoto ( Masumoto Kazuhiko; 9 May 1936 – 6 February 2022) was a Japanese politician. A member of the Japanese Communist Party, he served in the House of Representatives from 1972 to 1976. He died of bile duct cancer on 6 February 2022, at the age of 85.

References

1936 births
2022 deaths
20th-century Japanese politicians
Japanese Communist Party politicians
Members of the House of Representatives (Japan)
Members of the House of Representatives from Kanagawa Prefecture
Chuo University alumni
People from Kanagawa Prefecture
People from Fujisawa, Kanagawa